The Army Cadet College (ACC) is an defence service training institution which trains defence service personnel for the Indian Army.

The Army Cadet College Wing trains defence service personnel of  Personnel Below Officers Rank (PBOR) from the regular army, navy and air force for commissioning as officers in the Indian Army. It has 3 companies. The ACC feeds into the Indian Military Academy. The nature of training at ACC and the National Defence Academy is nearly identical - both run a 3-year degree course in science and humanities. The added advantages that the ACC cadets bring to the Army as officers are a deep understanding of the soldier life and a consequently better appreciation of the tasking of the men.

ACC has now been rebranded as the Siachen Battalion at the IMA.

The selection for admission to ACC is based on a written test and subsequent selection via Services Selection Board. ACC has been in operation for 80 years now and has graduated some notable alumni. The first course at IMA comprising 40 GCs (Gentleman Cadets, as trainees are called) included 15 from the erstwhile Kitchener College that became the ACC.

The entry criteria for ACC (which are often changed) means that most officers would retire before ever becoming the COAS in India, due to age constraints at promotion to higher ranks, irrespective of performance. Many exceptional officers have graduated from this highly aspirational institution.

The foundation of ACC can be traced to the Kitchener College founded in 1929 at Nowgong, Chhatarpur, Madhya Pradesh. The Kitchener College became the ACC in 1960, and in 1964 it relocated to Ghorpuri, near Pune, to take over the campus of the erstwhile OTI (merged into OTA Madras). The institute moved again in July 1977, this time to Dehradun, to become a wing of Indian Military Academy.

See also
 Indian National Defence University
 Military Academies in India
 Sainik school

References

External links

Army Cadet College and Exam Syllabus

Indian Army
1960 establishments in India